Mansoa is a genus of tropical, flowering vines in the family Bignoniaceae.

Its native range is Mexico to Tropical America, and it is found in Argentina, Belize, Bolivia, Brazil, Colombia, Costa Rica, Ecuador, El Salvador, French Guiana, Guatemala, Guyana, Honduras, Leeward Is., Mexico, Nicaragua, Panamá, Paraguay, Peru, Suriname, Trinidad-Tobago, Venezuela and Windward Is.

The genus name of Mansoa is in honour of Antônio Luiz Patrício da Silva Manso (1788–1848), a Brazilian botanist, physician, and politician. 
It was first described and published in Biblioth. Universelle Genève, sér.2, Vol.17 on page 128 in 1838.

Known species
According to Kew;

References

Further reading

 
Bignoniaceae genera
Vines
Plants described in 1838
Flora of Mexico
Flora of Central America
Flora of northern South America
Flora of western South America
Flora of Brazil
Flora of Northeast Argentina